Scottish baronial or Scots baronial is an architectural style of 19th century Gothic Revival which revived the forms and ornaments of historical architecture of Scotland in the Late Middle Ages and the Early Modern Period. Reminiscent of Scottish castles, buildings in the Scots baronial style are characterised by elaborate rooflines embellished with conical roofs, tourelles, and battlements with Machicolations, often with an asymmetric plan. Popular during the fashion for Romanticism and the Picturesque, Scots baronial architecture was equivalent to the Jacobethan Revival of 19th-century England, and likewise revived the Late Gothic appearance of the fortified domestic architecture of the elites in the Late Middle Ages and the architecture of the Jacobean era.

Among architects of the Scots baronial style in the Victorian era were William Burn and David Bryce. Romanticism in Scotland coincided with a Scottish national identity during the 19th century, and some of the most emblematic country residences of 19th-century Scotland were built in this style, including Queen Victoria's Balmoral Castle and Walter Scott's Abbotsford, while in urban settings Cockburn Street, Edinburgh was one street built wholly in baronial style. Baronial style buildings were typically of stone, whether ashlar or masonry.

Following Robert William Billings's Baronial and Ecclesiastical Antiquities of Scotland, architectural historians identified the stylistic features characteristic of the baronial castles built from the latter 16th century as Scots baronial style, which as a revived idiom architects continued to employ up until 1930s. Scottish baronial was core influence on Charles Rennie Mackintoshs Modern Style architecture. The style was considered a British national idiom emblematic of Scotland, and was widely used for public buildings, country houses, residences and follies throughout the British Empire. The Scottish National War Memorial was the last significant monument of the baronial style, built 1920 in Edinburgh Castle after World War I.

Revival and name 

The Scottish baronial style is also called Scotch baronial, Scots baronial or just baronial style. The name was invented in the 19th century and may come from Robert William Billings's book Baronial and Ecclesiastical Antiquities of Scotland, published in 1852. Before, the style does not seem to have had a name. The buildings produced by the Scottish baronial revival by far outnumber those of the original Scottish "baronial" castles of the Early Modern Period.

Predecessors 

Scottish baronial style drew upon the buildings of the Scottish Renaissance. The style of elite residences built by barons in Scotland developed under the influence of French architecture and the architecture of the County of Flanders in the 16th century and was abandoned by about 1660. The style kept many of the features of the high-rising medieval Gothic castles and introduced Renaissance features. The high and relatively thin-walled medieval fortifications had been made obsolete by gunpowder weapons but were associated with chivalry and landed nobility. High roofs, towers and turrets were kept for status reasons. Renaissance elements were introduced. This concerned mainly the windows that became bigger, had straight lintels or round bows and typically lacked mullions. The style drew on tower houses and peel towers, retaining many of their external features. French Renaissance also kept the steep roofs of medieval castles as can be seen for example at Azay-le-Rideau (1518), and the original Scottish baronial style might have been influenced by French masons brought to Scotland to work on royal palaces.

The style was quite limited in scope: a style for lesser Scottish landlords. The walls usually are rubble work and only quoins, window dressings and copings are in ashlar. Sculpted ornaments are sparsely used. In most cases the windows lack pediments. The style often uses corbelled turrets sometimes called tourelles, bartizans or pepperpot turrets. The corbels supporting the turret typically are roll-moulded. Their roofs were conical. Gables are often crow-stepped. Round towers supporting square garret chambers corbelled out over the cylinder of their main bodies are particular the Scottish baronial style. They can be seen at Claypotts, Monea, Colliston, Thirlestane, Auchans, Balvenie, and Fiddes.

Such castles or tower houses are typically built on asymmetric plans. Often this is a Z-plan as at Claypotts Castle (1569–1588), or on an L-plan as at Colliston. Roof lines are uneven and irregular.

The Scottish baronial style coexisted even in Scotland with Northern Renaissance architecture, which was preferred by the wealthier clients. William Wallace's work at the North Range of Linlithgow Palace (1618–1622) and at Heriot's Hospital (1628–1633) are examples of a contemporaneous Scottish Renaissance architecture. Wallace worked for the Countess of Home at Moray House on Edinburgh's Canongate, an Anglo-Scottish client who employed the English master mason Nicholas Stone at her London house in Aldersgate.

The baronial style as well as the Scottish Renaissance style finally gave way to the grander English forms associated with Inigo Jones in the later part of the seventeenth century.

Scottish baronial 
European architecture of the 19th century was dominated by revivals of various historic styles. This current took off in the middle of the 18th century with the Gothic Revival in Britain. The Gothic Revival in architecture has been seen as an expression of romanticism and according to Alvin Jackson, the Scots baronial style was "a Caledonian reading of the gothic". Some of the earliest evidence of a revival in Gothic architecture is from Scotland. Inveraray Castle, built starting from 1746 with design input from William Adam, incorporates turrets. These were largely conventional Palladian style houses that incorporated some external features of the Scots baronial style. William Adam's son's, Robert and James continued their father's approach, with houses such as Mellerstain and Wedderburn in Berwickshire and Seton House in East Lothian, but most clearly at Culzean Castle, Ayrshire, remodelled by Robert from 1777.

Large windows of plate glass are not uncommon. Bay windows often have their individual roofs adorned by pinnacles and crenulations. Porches, porticos and porte-cocheres, are often given the castle treatment. An imitation portcullis on the larger houses would occasionally be suspended above a front door, flanked by heraldic beasts and other medieval architectural motifs.

Important for the adoption of the style in the early nineteenth century was Abbotsford House, the residence of the novelist and poet Sir Walter Scott. Rebuilt for him from 1816, it became a model for the Scottish baronial Revival style. Common features borrowed from 16th- and 17th-century houses included battlemented gateways, crow-stepped gables, spiral stairs, pointed turrets and machicolations. Orchardton Castle near Auchencairn, Scotland is a superb example dating from the 1880s.

Important for the dissemination of the style was Robert Billings's (1813–1874) four-volume work Baronial and Ecclesiastical Antiquities of Scotland (1848–52). It was applied to many relatively modest dwellings by architects such as William Burn (1789–1870), David Bryce (1803–76), Edward Blore (1787–1879), Edward Calvert (c. 1847–1914) and Robert Stodart Lorimer (1864–1929) and in urban contexts, including the building of Cockburn Street in Edinburgh (from the 1850s) as well as the National Wallace Monument at Stirling (1859–1869). Dall House (1855) and Helen's Tower (1848) have square-corbelled-on-round towers or turrets. The rebuilding of Balmoral Castle as a baronial palace and its adoption as a royal retreat from 1855 to 1858 by Queen Victoria confirmed the popularity of the style.

This architectural style was often employed for public buildings, such as Aberdeen Grammar School (about 1860). However, it was by no means confined to Scotland and is a fusion of the Gothic revival castle architecture first employed by Horace Walpole for Strawberry Hill and the ancient Scottish defensive tower houses. In the 19th century it became fashionable for private houses to be built with small turrets. Such buildings were dubbed "in Scottish baronial style". In fact the architecture often had little in common with tower houses, which retained their defensive functions and were deficient with respect to 19th-century ideas of comfort. The revival often adapted the style to the needs and technical abilities of a later time.

Castle Oliver had all the classic features of the style, including battlements, porte-cochère, crow-stepped gables, numerous turrets, arrow slits, spiral stone staircases, and conical roofs.

This form of architecture was popular in the dominions of the British Empire. In New Zealand it was advocated by the architect Robert Lawson, who designed frequently in this style, most notably at Larnach Castle in Dunedin. Other examples in New Zealand include works by Francis Petre. In Canada,  Craigdarroch Castle, British Columbia, was built for Robert Dunsmuir, a Scottish coal baron, in 1890. In Toronto, E. J. Lennox designed Casa Loma in the Gothic Revival style for Sir Henry Pellatt, a prominent Canadian financier and industrialist. The mansion has battlements and towers, along with modern plumbing and other conveniences. Another Canadian example is the Banff Springs Hotel in the Banff National Park in Alberta, Canada. The style can also be seen outside the empire at Vorontsov Palace near the city of Yalta, Crimea.

Decline 

The popularity of the baronial style peaked towards the end of the nineteenth century, and the building of large houses declined in importance in the twentieth century. The baronial style continued to influence the construction of some estate houses, including Skibo Castle, which was rebuilt from 1899 to 1903 for industrialist Andrew Carnegie by Ross and Macbeth. Isolated examples included the houses designed by Basil Spence, Broughton Place (1936) and Gribloch (1937–1939), which combined modern and baronial elements.

The 20th-century Scottish baronial castles have the reputation of architectural follies. Among most patrons and architects the style became disfavoured along with the Gothic revival style during the early years of the 20th century.

See also 

List of Gothic Revival architecture
List of Gothic Revival architects
Prospect 100 best modern Scottish buildings

Notes

External links 
Freewebs.com: The Scottish baronial: an introduction and illustrations of five notable examples.
Craigends.org.uk, a detailed study of "David Bryce's lost masterpiece", demolished in 1971.
Castle-oliver.com, photographs and history of a recently restored Scottish baronial masterpiece.

 
Architecture in Scotland
Scottish baronial
Scottish baronial
16th-century architecture in the United Kingdom
17th-century architecture in the United Kingdom
16th century in Scotland
17th century in Scotland